Sport in Serbia plays an important role, and the country has a strong sporting history. The most popular sports in Serbia are football, basketball, tennis, volleyball, water polo and handball.

Professional sports in Serbia are organized by sporting federations and leagues (in case of team sports). One of particularities of Serbian professional sports is existence of many multi-sport clubs (called "sports societies"), biggest and most successful of which are Red Star (three world titles and seven European in various sports), Partizan (fourteen European titles in various sports), Radnički (three European titles in various sports) and Beograd in Belgrade, Vojvodina in Novi Sad, Radnički in Kragujevac, Spartak in Subotica.

Popular individual sports

Athletics
After folk games, athletics in the modern sense appeared at the beginning of the 20th century. Among the first events on the territory of Serbia was the race held in 1906 on the route Valjevo-Jovanje, and in 1908 the Gymnastics Association "Dusan Silni" founded the first athletic section. The founding of the Serbian Olympic Club in 1910 and the beginning of Serbia's participation in the Olympic Games were important for the further development of athletics.

When it comes to important competitions, the European Open Championship was organized in Belgrade in 1962, the European Indoor Games in 1966, and the European Club Championship for men in 1989, at which the most successful Serbian club, the Red Star, triumphed. In addition, the club recorded another second and third place, both in the men's and women's competition. Among the successful clubs are AK Partizan and AK New Belgrade. When it comes to the 21st century, the largest organized competition on the territory of Serbia is certainly the European Indoor Championship in 2017.

From the athletic competitions, the Belgrade Marathon and the memorial rally in honor of Artur Takač are held every year.

The greatest successes of athletes from Serbia includes:

 Vera Nikolić - two-time European champion in the 800 meter race (1966, 1971), and world record holder with a time of 2: 00.5 (1968—1971)
 Nenad Stekić - two-time vice-champion of the Old Continent (1974, 1978), former European record holder in long jump (8.45), three years the best result in the world (1975, 1977 and 1978)
 Milos Srejovic - European triple jump champion in 1978.
 Vladimir Milić - European champion in throwing the ball in the hall in 1982.
 Jovan Lazarevic - bronze in shot put at the European Indoor Championships in 1982.
 Dragan Zdravković - European champion in the 3000 meter indoor race in 1983.
 Snezana Pajkic - European champion in the 1500 meter race in 1990.
 Dragutin Topic - European champion in high jump 1990, European indoor champion 1996, bronze medal at the World Indoor Championships in 1997 and the European Indoor Championships in 1992 and 2000, (personal record 2.37 meters, among the 10 best of all time)
 Biljana Petrovic - silver medal in the high jump at the 1990 European Championships.
 Slobodan Brankovic - European indoor champion in the 400 meter race in 1992.
 Dragan Perić - bronze medal at the World Indoor Championships in 1995 and silver at the European Indoor Championships in 1994 in shot put
 Olivera Jevtić - the first athletic medal for Serbia since independence, a silver medal in the marathon at the 2006 European Championships, four bronze medals at the European Cross Country Championships.
 Emir Bekrić - bronze medal in the 400 meter hurdles at the 2013 World Championships, silver medal at the 2012 European Championships.
 Asmir Kolašinac - gold medal in throwing the ball at the European Indoor Championships in 2013, silver in 2015 and bronze from the European Championships in 2012.
 Mihail Dudash - bronze medals in heptathlon at the European Indoor Championships in 2013 and in decathlon at the European Championships in 2016.
 Ivana Španović - the most successful Serbian athlete, in the long jump discipline, among the most significant successes are bronze from the 2016 Olympic Games, the title of world champion in the hall 2018, two world bronze medals in the open (2013, 2015), four European champion titles - one in the open ( 2016) and three in the hall (2015, 2017, 2019).
 Tatjana Jelača - silver medal in javelin throw at the European Championship 2014.
 Strahinja Jovančević - bronze medal at the European Indoor Championships 2019 in long jump

Tennis

Recent success of Serbian tennis players has led to an immense growth in the popularity of tennis in Serbia. Novak Djokovic, 22 Grand Slam champion, finished in 2011, 2012, 2014, 2015, 2018, 2020 and 2021 as No. 1 in the world. Djokovic has won a record 10 Australian Open singles titles and also has the record for most weeks at number 1 in the ATP rankings. Monica Seles, a former world no. 1, member of the International Tennis Hall of Fame, won eight Grand Slam singles titles (while representing FR Yugoslavia). Ana Ivanovic (champion of 2008 French Open) and Jelena Janković were both ranked No. 1 in the WTA rankings. Janković was a Grand Slam champion in mixed doubles (2007 Wimbledon Championships). There were two No. 1 ranked-tennis double players as well: Nenad Zimonjić (three-time men's double and five-time mixed double Grand Slam champion) and Slobodan Živojinović (champion of 1986 US Open). The Serbia men's tennis national team won the 2010 Davis Cup, and 2020 ATP Cup, also two World Team Cup (in 2009 and 2012) while Serbia women's tennis national team reached the final at 2012 Fed Cup.

Karate
The most successful competitor in karate is Snezana Peric, who won gold medals at the World Games, World and European Championships, as well as bronze at the World Championships and five more medals at the European Championships.

Slobodan Bitević was the world champion, and he won silver and bronze medals at the European championships.

Medals were often won in team competition, and the greatest success was achieved in 2010, when the men's team won gold in kumite.

The European Championship was held in Belgrade in 1998, as well as the World Championship in 2010.

Other individual sports

Shooting sports

Archery
The Archery Association is an organization that takes care of the development of archery in Serbia and has 17 members.It was founded in 1955,and has been a member of the International Archery Federation since 1965.

Archery was developed in medieval Serbia. Serbian archers appear on the frescoes in the monasteries of Decani and Manasija long before many in the world. In the time of Emperor Dušan, when Dubrovnik recognized his rule, tournaments with bows and crossbows were held. At the Marriage of Dusanova, the archer-knight Miloš Vojnović hit the apple through the ring. The Serbian archers stood out in particular and brought victory over the superior Bulgarian army in the battle of Velbužde in 1330. There are written data from the period of Stefan Lazarević's rule about holding archery tournaments in the area under the walls of the Kalemegdan Fortress.

The biggest success in the last couple of years is the placement of Luka Grozdanović in the quarterfinals of the Mediterranean Games in 2013.

Darts
The Darts Federation of Serbia (PFS) is an Association of Darts Clubs that deals with the popularization and organization of competitions in STEEL or classic darts, which has been played in the world for almost a century and has been organized in Serbia practically since the day this association was founded. Registered in the Ministry of Sports in May 2009 and the founders of the then three registered clubs are: PK Pik As from Apatin, PK Gerila from N.Sad and PK Black Code from N.Sad, in the meantime they are joined by two more clubs (PK Kapitalci from Belgrade and PK SNG Vukovi from N.Sad).

After determining the basic goals, the realization of joining the World Darts Federation (WDF) started immediately, and after the positive signalization in September 2009, Serbia became a member of the WDF (conditionally) from 01.01.2010. and full-fledged on October 27, 2010, and shortly before that, more precisely on October 5, 2010, PFS was recognized as the umbrella organization for darts in Serbia by the Sports Federation of Serbia.

In the 2013/14 season, PFS gathers 16 registered darts clubs and over 200 players who took part in competitions, and from season to season, the number of clubs and players is constantly increasing.

Shooting
Shooting is one of the oldest sports in Serbia today. The first shooting club was founded in Bela Crkva in 1777, and the Association of Shooting Societies of the Kingdom of Serbia was formed in 1887.

Jasna Šekarić is one of the most trophy-winning people in Serbian sports. She won a gold medal (10m air pistol discipline) at the 1988 Olympics. At the same Games, she won a bronze medal in the sport pistol discipline. She continued her success in Barcelona in 1992, Sydney in 2000, and Athens in 2004, winning three silver medals in the air pistol disciplines. In addition, she was a three-time world champion and a four-time European champion, and also broke the world record.

Goran Maksimović won a gold medal in the air rifle disciplines at the 1988 Olympic Games, and Ivana Maksimović won silver in the small-caliber rifle three positions at the 2012 Olympic Games.

In addition to them, the shooters who won Olympic medals from Serbia are:

 Aleksandra Ivošev (1996 gold in the triple rifle discipline and bronze in the air rifle discipline, bronze with the European Championship)
 Aranka Binder (1992 Bronze in Air Rifle)
 Stevan Pletikosic (1992 bronze in Olympic discipline, world record, two silver medals with world championship)
 Andrija Zlatić (2012 bronze in the 10 m air pistol disciplines, European champion, two silver medals at the World and European Championships)

World records in the triple jump were broken by Vladimir Grozdanović and Mirjana Mašić (European Championship and double championship in air rifles),  and in air rifles Srećko Pejović (silver with European Championship)  and Ten Sasen-on foot, gold with European Championship

Zorana Arunović became the world champion in 2010 in the air pistol disciplines  and won a gold medal at the European Games in 2015, while among the successful shooters are Dušan Efafanić (bronze with the world championship), Nemanja Mirosavljev (bronze with WC, silver and bronze from the European Championship, Damir Mikec (silver at the European Championship, two gold medals at the European Games), Bobana Veličković (two-time European champion), Andreja Arsović (gold at the European Championship and European Games). ..

Unsuccessful shooting clubs are Crvena zvezda, Partizan, Policajac and Novi Sad in 1790.

The European Championship was held twice in Belgrade, in 2005 and 2011.

Water sports

Swimming
Milorad Čavić won a silver medal in swimming (discipline 100 meters butterfly) at the 2008 Olympic Games, and a gold and a silver medal at the 2009 World Championships. He won ten medals at the European Championships. He broke world and European records several times.

Nađa Higl became the world champion in the 200-meter breaststroke in 2009, breaking the European record.

Velimir Stjepanović won gold medals in the 200 m and 400 m freestyle at the European Championships in large pools, as well as a bronze medal at the World Championships in 25-meter pools in the 400 m freestyle.

Ivan Lenđer, Čaba Silađi, Miroslava Najdanovski and Szebasztián Szabó won medals at the Universiade, the Mediterranean Games, the European Championship in 25-meter pools, and junior championships.

The first World Aquatics Championships in water sports was held in Belgrade in 1973.

Among the most famous swimming clubs in Serbia are Partizan, Proleter and Vojvodina.

High diving
The Diving Association of Serbia is an organization that takes care of the development of diving on the territory of Serbia. It was founded in 1971 when it separated from the swimming association. There were a maximum of 13 clubs in the association. There are currently six members in the alliance, all from Belgrade.

The greatest success of a Serbian competitor at the international level is the silver medal of Selena Trajković, under the flag of Yugoslavia, from the Mediterranean Games in 1979 in Split in the platform discipline.

Siniša Žugić  and Vukan Vuletić participated in the 1996 Olympic Games in Atlanta. Vukan's father, Vukašin Vuletić Vuleta, is the founder of KSV Čukarički and is considered the initiator of the development of diving in Serbia.

Belgrade hosted the first World Diving Championship in 1973.

Kayak and canoe
The Kayak Federation of Yugoslavia was formed in 1930, and the Federation of Serbia in 1953.Four world and one European championships were held in Belgrade.

The best results in kayaking and canoeing were achieved at the 1984 Olympic Games in Los Angeles, when Mirko Nišović won a gold medal in the double canoe at 500 (S-2) and a silver at 1000, and Milan Janić won silver in the single kayak. 2) at 1000 m. They were both three-time world champions and won many more medals.

Milan Janić children are also kayakers. Mico and Stjepan won a silver medal in the 1000 m at the 1998 World Championships, and Natasa was successful in the junior competitions. Later, they changed their citizenship, Mićo and Stjepan joined the Croatian national team, and Nataša competes under the Hungarian flag, for which she won a large number of medals.

Ognjen Filipović, Dragan Zorić, Bora Sibinkić and Milan Đenandić were trophy four-seater in a kayak. In the 200 m race, among other things, they won gold at the world and European championships. Filipović won medals in the one-seater, but also in the two-seater with Zorić.

Dusko Stanojevic and Dejan Pajic won bronze at the 2010 World Championships and silver at the European Championships in 2011 in a two-seater kayak in the 500 meters. silver medals. In 2014, Novaković won a gold medal with Nebojsa Grujić at the world championships in the two-seater 200 m, with the fastest time of all time in that discipline. Then they won a silver medal at the European Championships and a gold medal at the European Games.

Antonija Nagy twice won a silver medal at the European championships in the 1000 meter race. The sisters, Nikolina and Olivera Moldovan, won a total of three medals at the world championships, three at the European and one at the European Games.

Dalma Benedek, after being an eight-time world and seven-time European champion, has been competing under the Serbian flag since 2013 and in the same year won gold medals at the European Championships in the 500 and 1,000 meters, and then bronze in the 500 meters at the World Championships. , as well as up to two or two bronze medals at the European Championship and gold at the European Games with Milica Starović.

Rowing
The Rowing Federation of Serbia, then Yugoslavia, was founded in 1922. Regatta centers in Serbia are on Srebrno jezero, in Belgrade on Savsko jezero, in Čurug on Mrtva Tisa, in Knić on Gružansko jezero.The European Championships were held in Belgrade in 1932 and 2014.

The most successful clubs are Belgrade's Partizan and Crvena zvezda, which are located on Ada Ciganlija.

Zoran Pančić and Milorad Stanulov are Serbian rowers, who won a silver medal (M2x) for Yugoslavia in the 1980 Olympic Games in Moscow and a bronze medal in Los Angeles in 1984.

The most successful rowers in independent Serbia are Nikola Stojić and Goran Jagar, who were European champions as a duo without a coxswain (M2 -).Nikola Stojić won a gold medal with Jovan Popović at the 2006 World Championships in the doubles with a coxswain (M2 +), while with Jagar, Popović and Marko Marjanović he won silver in the quadruple with a coxswain (M4 +) in 2007. Stojić also won with Nenad Bedjik. in the discipline, the duo without a coxswain won a bronze (2012) and a gold medal (2013) at the European Championships. Besides them, Goran Nedeljković, Miloš Tomić, Nenad Babović, Dušan Bogićević and Veselin Savić won medals at the biggest competitions. Iva Obradović won two silver medals at the European Championships.

Sailing
The organization that manages sailing in Serbia is the Sailing Federation of Serbia. Serbian competitors compete at the World and European Championships.

Currently, the most successful member of the Serbian national team is Luka Tošić, who won a gold medal at the European Junior Championships in the Laser 4.7 class,  as well as a bronze medal at the World Championships in the same class.

Synchronized swimming
The Synchronized Swimming Federation was founded in 1992. The beginnings of synchronized swimming in Belgrade date back to 1968, when a synchronized swimming section led by Vukašin Vuletić worked at the Tasmajdan swimming pool. The first school and section of synchronized swimming in Serbia was founded in 1973, at the pool "May 25", led by Franz Senica. The school later grew into the first club in synchronized swimming called "25. May ". Until 1984, it was the only type of organized synchronous swimming in Belgrade and the then SFRY. In 1984, the synchronized swimming section "SIRENA" in Kruševac started working. Two years later, in 1986, the club "Banjica" was formed, and in 1989 the club "Tasmajdan" in Belgrade. The first state championship in synchronized swimming was held in 1993. After this championship, clubs are being formed in Sabac, Obrenovac, Nis. Today, 10 clubs are registered in the federation.

The first international competition in which our national team participated was the International Rally in Split, in 1980. The national team made its first participation in the European Championship in 1991 in the discipline of solo and doubles, with swimmers: Snežana Novokmet, Biljana Stošić and Maja Ostojić. The national team participated for the first and so far only time in the 1992 Olympic Games in Barcelona with swimmers Maria Senica,  Maja Kos  and Vanja Mičet.

The first World Championship in synchronized swimming was held in Belgrade in 1973 as part of the World Championship in water sports.

Bowling
The national team of Serbia were two-time world champions in bowling in 9 cones and broke the team world record. Vilmos Zavarko is the world record holder in individual competition, and he won four gold, three silver and two bronze medals at the world championships, as well as the first place on the world ranking list.

Badminton
The Badminton Association of Serbia is an organization that manages badminton in Serbia. Like clubs, it was founded in 1993. The first competition that was organized was the First Open Open Championship of Yugoslavia in badminton, held in January 1994 in Belgrade. Clubs are located in cities throughout Serbia: Belgrade, Novi Sad, Nis, Kragujevac, Pancevo, Subotica, Kraljevo...

Serbia made its debut at the European Championship in 2012, which was held in Sweden with six representatives, in men's and women's singles, men's and women's doubles, and mixed doubles. Serbia was represented by: Milica Simić, Sandra Halilović, Igor Bjelan, Ilija Pavolović, Nikola Arsić and Vladimir Savić. They are also the best Serbian badminton players.

Chess
There are 46 grandmasters (active and inactive) among Serbian chess players.At the Chess Olympics in 1950, the Yugoslav national team won a gold medal, and among the Serbian chess players in the national team were Petar Trifunović and Svetozar Gligorić, who won a large number of medals at other Olympics, as well as at European championships. Among the most successful Serbian grandmasters are Aleksandar Matanović, Milan Matulović, Ivan Ivanišević, Dragan Šolak, Aleksandar Kovačević, Branko Damljanović, Igor Miladinović ...

There are 11 grandmasters among the female competitors.The most successful Serbian chess player is the former Minister of Sports and Youth, Alisa Marić, who won two bronze medals at the Chess Olympics, as well as a silver medal at the European Championship in 1999.

Novi Sad hosted the Olympics in 1990, as well as the European Team Championship in 2009. In 1970, a match was held in Belgrade for the first time between the Soviet Union, as the most successful national team, and the rest of the world.

Cycling
Doctor and academician Djordje Nesic participated in international bicycle races in Europe as a student. On his initiative, the First Serbian Bicycle Association was founded in 1884, and he was elected president.The first competition race was held in Belgrade in 1896, and the following year the first national championship was held.

Every year, the Cycling Federation of Serbia organizes the Serbian Road Cycling Championship and the international cycling race Through Serbia.The race through Serbia has a tradition since 1939. The most trophy-winning Serbian cyclists are: Mikoš Rnjaković, Aleksandar Nikačević and Ivan Stević.

Jovana Crnogorac is the most successful Serbian national team member in mountain biking.

Equestrian sport
The Association for Equestrian Sports of Serbia is an organization that manages equestrian sports in Serbia and organizes the state championship. It was founded in 2001.

For many years, since 1964, on the first weekend of September, the Ljubičevo Equestrian Games have been held in Požarevac. The Ljubičevo Equestrian Games are a two-day equestrian holiday for the people of Požarevac and all fans of equestrian sports and equestrian skills. The day before the competition, a procession of all participants in the games paraded through the center of Pozarevac. On that occasion, an oath was solemnly taken, by which the participants are obliged to compete in sports and chivalry. In addition to trotters, gallopers, hurdles and dressage, there are also attractions Ljubičevski višeboj, horse show, vaulting of children - children aged 2 to 6 perform them with the help of their trainers, and the meaning of the exercises is to get used to horses, maintain balance.

Fencing
In Serbia, fencing, as a sport, appeared in the middle of the 19th century. At the beginning of the 20th century, competitors from Serbia compete in public classes, intercity competitions, but also abroad in international competitions. After the First World War, on the initiative of Belgrade swordsmen, the Yugoslav Fencing Federation was founded with its headquarters in Belgrade, and later in Zagreb. The first individual state championship was held in 1928, and the club championship in 1939. During the Second World War, the Federation ceased to operate. After the Second World War, in 1949, the work of the Alliance was renewed and it was renamed the Fencing Alliance of Yugoslavia.

As Yugoslav national team players, Serbian swordsmen competed at the 1960 Rome Olympics, including Aleksandar Vasin and Vera Jeftimijades. She also won bronze medals at the European Championships in Heideheim and the 1971 Mediterranean Games in Izmir.

The main organization in charge of fencing in Serbia is the Fencing Association of Serbia. The most successful Serbian swordswoman is Tamara Savić-Šotra, a triple participant in the Olympic Games under the flag of FR Yugoslavia.

The greatest success of the Serbian leadership since the independence of Serbia in 2006 is the bronze medal at the Mediterranean Games in Mersin in 2013, which was won by Smiljka Rodić.

Gymnastics
Gymnastics appeared among Serbs in the middle of the nineteenth century. The director of the Serbian Great Orthodox Gymnasium in Novi Sad, Djordje Natosevic, introduced classes and descriptive assessment. Stevan Todorović founded the First Serbian Society for Gymnastics and Wrestling in 1857, and in 1860 the first public class was organized, which was his first public appearance.

Tereza Kočiš is a Serbian gymnast, who won a silver medal on the ground floor at the 1950 World Championships, and won silver medals on the beam and two-height loom at the European Championships in 1963, as well as a bronze medal on the ground floor. At the same championship, Mirjana Bilić became the European champion in all-around and on the floor, and she also won bronze on the beam.

Belgrade hosted the European Men's Championship in 1963.

As for rhythmic gymnastics, Milena Reljin took 5th place at the 1984 Olympic Games in Los Angeles, and Danijela Simić 10. Last time, at the Olympic Games, Serbia had a representative in 1992 in Barcelona, namely Majda Milak and Kristina Radonjic.

Golf
The first golf club in Serbia was founded in 1936, on Kosutnjak, thanks to the initiative of Prince Pavle Karadjordjevic. The built golf course met the highest standards. The development of this elite sport in Serbia was stopped by the Second World War. Only after seventy years, two golf courses were built. Thanks to the newly built golf courses in Serbia, there are more and more fans of this game. For many, playing golf is a recreation, enjoying nature, but also a place where important business conversations take place.

The only places where golf lovers can train and compete in Serbia are the Golf Club "Belgrade", on Ada Ciganlija, and the Club "Center", Zabalj near Zrenjanin. The fact that Serbia has only two professional golfers speaks volumes about how young golf is in Serbia.

In 2002, the Golf Club Belgrade was founded on Ada Ciganlija and a luxurious course was built on an area of 35 hectares with nine holes, according to all world standards. Only four kilometers away from the center of Belgrade, in the most beautiful part of Ada Ciganlija, is the Golf Complex.

Golf Center Žabalj is located along the main road Novi Sad - Zrenjanin, municipality of Zabalj. It is 100 kilometers away from Belgrade, and 30 kilometers from Novi Sad. It covers an area of 38 hectares. Within the complex there is a golf course with nine fields 2.7 kilometers long. The course has all the necessary standards for organizing golf tournaments.

Squash
The Yugoslav Squash Association was founded in August 2001 in Belgrade. Immediately after its founding, JSA became a member of the European as well as the World Squash Federation. The Squash Association of Serbia was also established, as well as the Squash Association of Belgrade.

Like any beginning, this one was difficult, but with the help of many fans of this sport, SQUASHLAND, the first squash club in Serbia, was opened in Belgrade in 2003. Squashland, which is located in Pionirski Grad, has two squash courts within Košutnjak and is considered a symbol of the beginning of squash in Serbia. The first national championship of Serbia was held in October 2004, and immediately after that championship, the first national team was formed, which already participated in the European Nations Cup in Slovenia in November. Numerous international tournaments were held in Squashland, such as the Serbian Open, the Belgrade Trophy, the Squashland Open,...

In 2006, after the separation of Montenegro, the name of the Association was changed. From JSA, SAS (Squash Association of Serbia) was formed. That same year, two more clubs were opened, one in Subotica and one in Novi Sad. The first tournament at Glas Court was held in Belgrade, which was set up on Nikola Pašić Square. This tournament was organized with the great help of the City of Belgrade, the Republic Sports Administration, the SQUASHLAND club and the Belgrade Squash Association.

The organization of this competition also marked the beginning of a new promotion of this sport in Serbia.

Table tennis
In table tennis, Serbian athletes are the most successful in the doubles game. Ilija Lupulescu won a silver Olympic medal in men's doubles in 1988, and Jasna Fazlić and Gordana Perkučin won a bronze medal in women's doubles. Zoran Kalinic won one world title and 3 European doubles titles. He has 3 more silver medals from the world championships. Aleksandar Karakašević was the European champion in mixed doubles three times, in 2000, 2005 and 2007, all three times in a pair with the Lithuanian Ruta Pakauskiene. He won five more medals at the European Championships, including a bronze medal in the individual competition in 2011. In 2003, Silvija Erdelji won a bronze medal in the individual competition at the European Championships, as well as in doubles with her sister Anamarija Erdelji.

In 1981, Novi Sad hosted competitors at the 36th World Table Tennis Championships (SPENS). Belgrade hosted the European Championship in 2007.

Triathlon
In Serbia, the triathlon was held unofficially for the first time in 1988 in Kragujevac. The first national championship was organized in Ada Ciganlija in 1993.

The most successful triathlete from Serbia is Ognjen Stojanović. He achieved the greatest success at the World Aquathlon Championships in 2012, where he won a bronze medal.

Weight lifting
The organization that manages weightlifting in Serbia is the Weightlifting Federation of Serbia.

Medals in this sport have been won in the past at the Mediterranean Games. Serbia last had a representative at the 1996 Olympic Games in Atlanta, Miodrag Kovačić. Currently, the most successful member of the national team is Silvana Vukas, a silver medalist from the World University Championships.

Belgrade hosted the European Championship in 1980.

Motorsports
Milos Pavlovic is a Serbian motorist, the only one with a license to compete in Formula 1. He was the champion in Nissan's world light series, and in 2007 he won third place in the Formula Renault series with two victories. He competed in Formula 2 in 2009 and took 9th place, he was on the podium twice. As a member of Ford's team, he competed in the FIA GT1 World Championship in 2011 and 2012.

Dušan Borković won the title of champion in the European Mountain Racing Championship in 2012, winning eight of the eleven races.A year earlier, he took third place. As a representative of the NIS Petrol Racing Team in the European Touring Cup car in 2013 took third place in the overall standings, and since 2014 competes in the FIA World Touring Car Championship.

The Belgrade Grand Prix was the last Grand Prix motorcycle race, the forerunner of Formula 1, before the start of World War II. The only domestic competitor, Boško Milenković, took the fourth place.

Popular team sports

Football
Football is the most popular sport in Serbia, and the Football Association of Serbia with 146,845 registered players, is the largest sporting association in the country. Dragan Džajić was officially recognized as "the best Serbian player of all times" by the Football Association of Serbia, and more recently the likes of Nemanja Vidić, Dejan Stanković, Branislav Ivanović, Aleksandar Kolarov, Nemanja Matić and Dušan Tadić play for the elite clubs of Europe, developing the nation's reputation as one of the world's biggest exporters of footballers. The Serbia national football team lacks relative success although it qualified for four of the last five FIFA World Cups. Serbia national youth football teams have won 2013 U-19 European Championship and 2015 U-20 World Cup. The two main football clubs in Serbia are Red Star (winner of the 1991 European Cup and 1991 Intercontinental Cup) and Partizan (finalist of the 1966 European Cup), both from Belgrade. The rivalry between the two clubs is known as the "Eternal Derby".

In addition to the triumph of the Red Star, the Serbian football players who won the Champions League with their clubs are Velibor Vasović, Nemanja Vidić, Dejan Stanković and Branislav Ivanović, and in women's football Jovana Damnjanović. The best scorers of the season were Miloš Milutinović, Vladica Kovačević, Silvester Takač, Borislav Cvetković, Milinko Pantić.

Bora Milutinović is one of the most successful coaches in the world. He led a large number of world clubs and national teams, and participated in the World Cups with five different national teams.

The House of Football, the sports center of the Football Association of Serbia, was opened in Stara Pazova in 2011, with open and closed fields, a hotel, a swimming pool and a gym. The sports center prepares football teams of all ages, organizes schools and camps for young players, coaches and referees are being trained.

Basketball
Serbia is one of the traditional powerhouses of world basketball, as Serbia men's national basketball team have won two World Championships (in 1998 and 2002), three European Championships (in 1995, 1997, and 2001), one FIBA Diamond Ball (in 2004), and two Olympic silver medals (in 1996 and 2016) as well. The women's national basketball team won the European Championship twice in 2015 and 2021      and Olympic bronze medal in 2016. Serbia men's national 3x3 team have won five FIBA 3x3 World Cups (in 2012, 2016, 2017,2018 and 2022), and four FIBA 3x3 Europe Cup (2018, 2019, 2021 and 2022). A total of 31 Serbian players (four with an NBA ring) have played in the NBA in last three decades, including Nikola Jokić (two-time NBA Most Valuable Player and a four-time NBA All-Star), Predrag "Peja" Stojaković (three-time NBA All-Star) and Vlade Divac (2001 NBA All-Star and Basketball Hall of Famer). The renowned "Serbian coaching school" produced many of the most successful European basketball coaches of all times, such as Željko Obradović, who won a record 9 Euroleague titles as a coach. The first foreign coach in the history of any NBA team is Igor Kokoškov. KK Partizan basketball club was the 1992 European champion and ŽKK Crvena zvezda women's basketball club was 1979 European champion.

Miloš Teodosić (2010) and Nemanja Bjelica (2015) received the award for the most useful player in the Euroleague, and Predrag Danilović, Žarko Paspalj, Zoran Savić, Željko Rebrača and twice Dejan Bodiroga were named the most useful players in the final tournament. The best scorers of the Euroleague were Predrag Danilović, Predrag Stojaković, Miroslav Berić, Miloš Vujanić and three times Igor Rakočević.

Radivoj Korać, Dragan Kićanović, Vlade Divac, Zoran Slavnić and Dražen Dalipagić , who is also a member of the NBA Hall of Fame, were admitted to the FIBA Hall of Fame. Aleksandar Nikolić and Ranko Žeravica were received from the coaches, and Obrad Belošević from the basketball referees.

Volleyball
It is believed that Serbs first played volleyball in 1918, when Serbian soldiers did so on the Thessaloniki front. In 1924, several American sports were demonstrated in Belgrade and Novi Sad, including volleyball.

Serbia is one of the leading volleyball countries in the world. Its men's national team won the gold medal at 2000 Olympics, silver and bronze medal at the World Championship, the European Championship on 3 occasions (in 2001, 2011 and 2019) as well as the 2016 FIVB World League. The women's national volleyball team have won 2018 FIVB Volleyball Women's World Championship, European Championship three times (in 2011, 2017 and 2019) as well as Olympic silver medal in 2016.

The most famous volleyball players in Serbia are: Andrija Gerić, Vladimir and Nikola Grbić, Ivan Miljković. Miljković was named the most useful player of the European Championship in 2001 and 2011, and Jovana Brakočević in 2011. Tijana Bošković was named by the FIVB and CEV as the most useful volleyball player of the European Championship in 2017 and the World Championship in 2018. [38]

Vladimir Grbić is a member of the Volleyball Hall of Fame, as well as the Volleyball Hall of Fame together with his brother Nikola.

Handball
The Handball Federation of Serbia is a house that organizes domestic leagues and manages the women's and men's handball national teams of Serbia.

According to some data, handball was introduced in Serbian schools in 1930, but it reached popularity only in the 1940s. He gained supporters during work actions. The Handball Federation was founded in 1949. Serbia hosted the 2012 European Championship in men's competition. At this competition, the Serbian national team won second place and a silver medal, and Momir Ilić received the award for the most useful player. In the same year, the women's championship was organized, and the next world championship for women, at which the Serbian national team won silver.

RK Metaloplastika has twice been the champion of the Champions League. It is the most trophy-winning club in the national championship.Among the most successful clubs in the Serbian Super League are Red Star and Partizan.

Dragan Skrbic were named IHF Player of the Year.One of the most famous players from the so-called of the golden generation is Mile Isaković.

In 1988, Svetlana Kitić was named IHF Player of the Year, and in 2010 she was named the world's best handball player in history. Andrea Lekić is the winner of the award for the best handball player in the world in 2013.

Water polo
In Serbia, water polo was originally played on the territory of Vojvodina, the first matches were played in Sombor at the beginning of the 20th century. Students who have studied in Hungary, Austria and Germany, where this sport has already been developed, are most responsible for the arrival of water polo.

The Serbia men's national water polo team is the second most successful national team after Hungary in the history of sport, having won two Olympic gold medal (in 2016 and 2020), three World Championships (2005, 2009 and 2015). The last 3 FINA World Cups in 2006, 2010, 2014. A record 12 FINA World Leagues and eight European Championships in 1991 (the Croatian federation boycotted), 2001, 2003, 2006, 2012, 2014, 2016 and 2018, respectively. VK Partizan has won a seven European champion titles, VK Bečej and VK Crvena zvezda one.

The most famous players of the golden age of Serbian water polo were: Igor Milanović, Aleksandar Šoštar, Vladimir Vujasinović, Aleksandar Šapić and Vanja Udovičić.

Vanja Udovicic in 2010 and Filip Filipovic in 2011 and 2014 received FINA awards for the best water polo players in the world.

Igor Milanović and Mirko Sandić are members of the House of Famous Water Sports.

Other team sports

Beach volleyball
The Volleyball Federation of Serbia is in charge of the development of beach volleyball in Serbia. Beach volleyball was first played in Serbia in the early 1990s, when Ivan Bugarcic, then a Red Star junior, and his friends decided to have fun and stay in shape during the summer by pruning trunks and hanging a net. In the same year, a tournament was held at the Novi Sad Strand. A year later, the Volleyball Association of Belgrade launched an initiative to create a section within the association, which was also the beginning of organized work. The first championship was held in 1997, and a year later the tournament in San Diego was won.

There are currently two competitions in Serbia: the Championship and the Cup, which are played according to the tournament system.

Since 2008, the European Masters Tournament has been organized in Novi Sad, with the participation of players from several different countries.

The most successful competitors at the moment are Stefan Basta and Igor Tešić, the champions of the Balkans, who also achieved notable placements at the Masters in Novi Sad.

Rugby Union
Rugby Union has a long history in Serbia. The first written trace of Serbs playing rugby dates back to the First World War. On April 11, 1918, in front of 10,000 spectators in Edinburgh, Serbian rugby players played the first international match called Serbia against the selection of the British Dominions and recorded a victory. Rugby appeared in Serbia after the First World War. The first Serbian rugby club Beli Orao was founded in Šabac in 1919. However, rugby has still not managed to break through among the most popular sports in Serbia. The attention of the media and the financial support of the state and Serbian businessmen are given to some other sports, which are not nearly as popular in the world as rugby.

The rugby Union national team of Serbia competes in the South 2 division of the European Rugby Championship. There are currently a dozen active amateur rugby clubs in Serbia, which are divided into two leagues.

Rugby League

Rugby League is the more popular Rugby code in Serbia. The rules of this game are much simpler than the more complex Rugby Union code.

The Serbian Rugby League Federation was founded in 2001 and became Full Members of the European Rugby League, which they achieved in August 2011. It led the second incarnation of a code which was played liberally in the 1950s and 1960s before abandonment by the old Yugoslavian sports authorities.

The Serbian Rugby League Federation was one of the founders of the European Rugby League and one of the five original Affiliate Members. After federal government recognition in 2005 the Serbian Rugby League Federation eventually completed its official status following inclusion into the Serbian Sports Association in 2009.

The seat of the Federation is in Belgrade, Serbia’s historic capital city. The Serbian Rugby League Federation is managed by the five-member Board, which is chosen by members of the general assembly quadrennially. The general assembly consists of all Serbian clubs, departments and regional federations and holds its AGM at the end of every year.

The main Serbian Rugby League Federation competition is the Serbian Rrugby League Championship, followed by Serbian Rugby League Cup. Both are played from March-October. The UniLeague or student competition is staged during the winter off-season. Serbia deploys national teams at senior (The Eagles) and junior levels (U18 and U16 ). The representative season also comprises the Serbian Origin Cup.

Regional federations (Belgrade, Vojvodina and South) administer youth development and organize U16 and lower age grade competitions. Coaching and Match Official Departments provide education in each sector.

They became International Rugby League full members in May 2012.

The Rugby League national team of Serbia is the 2nd power in Europe, only behind England and 8th power in the IRL Men's World Rankings. The Serbian National Rugby League team did not qualify for the 2021 Rugby League World Cup - Mens, losing to Greece and Scotland in 2nd Round Europe Pool B qualifying.

Winter sports
Serbian sports athletes are regular participants in the Winter Olympics, but as of 2022 Serbia has not yet won a single medal.

The first organized skiing was in 1922 in the winter-mountaineering section of the Serbian Mountaineering Association, and in the sports sense in 1929, when a cross-country skiing competition was organized on Avala. In 1935, the Mountaineering Association built a mountain lodge on Kopaonik, which was used by skiers from Belgrade, and the following year the first championship in alpine disciplines was held.

According to some data, skating has been practiced in Novi Sad since the end of the nineteenth century. It was originally skated on frozen natural water surfaces. The first artificial ice rink was built in 1890.The best Serbian skater is Trifun Živanović. He won medals at prestigious international competitions, was a participant in World and European Championships. He participated in the Olympic Games in Turin in 2006, which no Serbian competitor managed to repeat. Among skaters, Helena Pajović and Ksenija Jastsenjski achieved more significant results.

Jelena Lolović is the most successful alpine skier. She won medals at the Winter Universiade. Nevena Ignjatović, a gold medalist in slalom at the 2013 Universiade, is also a successful alpine skier. The largest ski centers in Serbia are located on Kopaonik, Zlatibor and Stara Planina.

Milanko Petrovic achieved the greatest success in cross-country skiing in Serbia. He won a gold medal at the 2013 Universiade in the 10 km freestyle.

At the European Biathlon Championships in 2012 in the sprint discipline, Milanko Petrović took 9th place, and at the 2013 World Cup race in Oberhof, Germany, he won the first points, which are also the first points of Serbia ever at the World Cup and the most valuable. the result of Serbian biathlon. At the Universiade in 2013, he won a gold medal in the 10 km sprint and a bronze medal in the individual 20 km.

The most successful and most trophy-winning Serbian snowboarder is Nina Micic. She won silver at the 2007 European Youth Olympic Festival in Haki, which is also the only international medal in winter sports under the Serbian flag, participates in the World Cup and regularly wins points.The first snowboarding park in Serbia was opened on Kopaonik in 2012.The Serbian bobsled team competed in the 2002 Salt Lake City Olympics, where it finished 25th. and Vancouver in 2010, where he was 18th.The best place at the European Championships was 10th place in 2013 in Austria. The most successful Serbian bobsledder is Vuk Radjenovic, who is currently among the top 50 in the world.

Among the most trophy-winning clubs in the national hockey championship are Partizan, Crvena zvezda and Vojvodina. Since the founding of the Serbian Hockey League, no more than 5 clubs have participated. Partizan won every championship, and counting the Yugoslav championships, he was the champion 16 times. Partizan also triumphed twice in the regional Slohokej league.

Five ski jumps were built on the territory of Serbia. They were located on Avala, Košutnjak, Fruška gora, Goč and Kopaonik. Currently, there is only a ski jump on Goč, but it is not in use either.

In 2005, Belgrade hosted the World Junior Speed Skating Championships.

Athletes with disabilities
The Paralympic Committee of Serbia is a national Paralympic Committee that organizes and sends athletes to competitions adapted for competitors with disabilities, primarily the Paralympic Games. The chairman of the committee is Zoran Mićović. The most developed throwing disciplines are in athletics. Zeljko Dereta became the Paralympic champion in shot put in 1984, breaking the world record, and he also won a silver medal in shot put and a bronze medal in discus throw. Nada Vuksanović won gold (with a world record) and silver in shot put and gold in discus throw. Draženko Mitrović won two silver Paralympic medals in discus throw, as well as five silver medals from world championships and other throwing disciplines, he was a three-time European champion and broke the world record. Tanja Dragić also broke the world record, and in 2011 she became the champion at the world championships, and the next Paralympic ones in javelin throwing. Zeljko Dimitrijevic broke the world record in shot put in 2012 and won the Paralympic gold. Milos Grlica won a bronze medal in javelin throw in 2004, and he was also the European champion. Slobodan Adzic won Paralympic medals in racing disciplines, silver in the 1,500 and 5,000 meters, two bronze medals in the 400 and one in the 5,000 meters.

In 1988, the SFRY national team won a gold medal in goalball. Miroslav Jančić was a member of the team, but he also competed in athletics and won gold in pentathlon, as well as silver in javelin throw and bronze in fast walking.

The most successful competitors in table tennis are Svetislav Dimitrijevic, winner of two gold and one silver Paralympic medal, Zlatko Kesler, one gold, two silver and bronze, world and European champion, Borislava Peric, two silver medals from 2008 and 2012, as well as gold from European Championships, Zoran Gajić two bronze medals from the Paralympic Games.

In archery, Ružica Aleksov won two gold and one silver medal at the Paralympic Games, Simo Kecman was the Paralympic champion, and Radomir Rakonjac won a silver medal. Drago Ristic and Sinisa Vidic broke world records.

The greatest successes in swimming were achieved by Nenad Krišanović, who won gold and two silver medals, and Jovo Cvetanovski was the world champion.

Lazar Filipović won a silver medal at the 2012 World Paratriathlon Championships.

National leagues
Football:
Serbian Superliga 
Serbian First League 
Serbian League 
Serbian SuperLiga (women)
Prva Futsal Liga 
Serbian cup 
Serbian Women's Cup

Basketball:
Basketball League of Serbia
Second Basketball League of Serbia
First Regional Basketball League Serbia
Second Regional Basketball League Serbia
First Women's Basketball League of Serbia
Cup Radivoj Korac
Milan Ciga Vasojević Cup
ABA League
ABA League Second Division
ABA League Supercup
WABA League
Volleyball:
Volleyball League of Serbia
Serbian Women's Volleyball League
Handball:
Handball League of Serbia
Serbian Handball Cup
Serbian First League of Handball for Women
SEHA League
Water Polo:
Serbian Water Polo League A
Serbian Water Polo Cup
Ice hockey:
Serbian Hockey League
Panonian League
Slohokej League
Rugby football:
Rugby Championship of Serbia
Serbian Rugby League Championship

National sports teams

Football:
Serbia national football team
Serbia national under-21 football team
Serbia national under-20 football team
Serbia national under-19 football team
Serbia national under-17 football team
Serbia national beach soccer team
Serbia women's national football team
Serbia women's national under-19 football team
Serbia women's national under-17 football team
Serbia national futsal team

Basketball:
Serbia men's national basketball team
Serbia men's national under-20 basketball team
Serbia men's national under-19 basketball team
Serbia men's national under-18 basketball team
Serbia men's national under-17 basketball team
Serbia men's national under-16 basketball team
Serbian men's university basketball team
Serbia women's national basketball team
Serbia women's national under-20 basketball team
Serbia women's national under-18 and under-19 basketball team
Serbia women's national under-16 and under-17 basketball team
Serbian women's university basketball team
Serbia men's national 3x3 team
Serbia men's national under-18 3x3 team
Serbia women's national 3x3 team

Volleyball:
Serbia men's national volleyball team
Serbia men's national under-21 volleyball team
Serbia men's national under-19 volleyball team
Serbia women's national volleyball team
Serbia women's national under-23 volleyball team
Serbia women's national under-20 volleyball team
Serbia women's national under-18 volleyball team

Handball:
Serbia men's national handball team
Serbia women's national handball team
Serbia men's national youth handball team
Serbia national beach handball team
Serbia women's national beach handball team

Water polo:
Serbia men's national water polo team
Serbia women's national water polo team

Tennis:
Serbia Davis Cup team
Serbia Fed Cup team
Serbia Hopman Cup team

Rugby league:
Serbia national rugby league team

Rugby union
Serbia national rugby union team
Serbia national rugby sevens team
Serbia women's national rugby union team
Serbia women's national rugby sevens team

Ice hockey:
Serbia national ice hockey team
Serbia men's national junior ice hockey team
Serbia men's national under-18 ice hockey team

Softball 

 Serbia women's national softball team

Baseball 

 Serbia national baseball team

Cricket 

 Serbia national cricket team

Korfball 

 Serbia national korfball team

American football 

 Serbia national American football team

Achievements

Football

Club
UEFA Champions League

1990–91 winners: Red Star Belgrade
1965–66 runners-up: Partizan

UEFA Europa League

 1978–79  runners-up: Red Star Belgrade

UEFA Super Cup 

 1991 Runners-up Red Star Belgrade

Intercontinental Cup 
1991  winners: Red Star Belgrade

Mitropa Cup 

 1958 winners Red Star Belgrade
 1967–68 winners Red Star Belgrade
 1976–77 winners Vojvodina
 1977–78 winners Partizan
International (men)

 2004 Runners-up UEFA European Under-21 Championship
 2007 Runners-up UEFA European Under-21 Championship
 2015 Champions FIFA U-20 World Cup
 2013 Champions UEFA European Under-19 Championship

Tournament:

 Serbia at the FIFA World Cup
 Serbia at the UEFA European Championship

Serbia national football team results:

 Serbia national football team results
 Serbia national football team results (2006–2009)
 Serbia national football team results (2010–2019)
 Serbia national football team results (2020–present)
 Serbia national under-21 football team results
Serbian football clubs in European competitions:

 FK Partizan in European football
 Red Star Belgrade in European football
 FK Vojvodina in European football
 FK Radnički Niš in European football
 OFK Beograd in European football

Basketball

International (men)

Serbia men's national basketball team:

 1996 Runners-up Basketball at the Summer Olympics
 2016 Runners-up Basketball at the Summer Olympics
 1998 Champions FIBA World Championship
 2002 Champions FIBA World Championship
 2014 Runners-up FIBA World Championship
 1995 Champions EuroBasket
 1997 Champions EuroBasket
 1999 Third place EuroBasket
 2001 Champions EuroBasket
 2009 Runners-up EuroBasket
 2017 Runners-up EuroBasket
Serbia men's national under-20 basketball team:

 1998, 2006, 2007, 2008, 2015 Champions FIBA U20 European Championship
 1996, 2005, 2014 Third place FIBA U20 European Championship

Serbia men's national under-19 basketball team

 2007 Champions FIBA Under-19 Basketball World Cup
 2011, 2013 Runners-up FIBA Under-19 Basketball World Cup

Serbia men's national under-18 basketball team

 2005, 2007, 2009, 2017, 2018 Champions FIBA U18 European Championship
 2011, 2014 Runners-up FIBA U18 European Championship
 1996, 2012 Third place FIBA U18 European Championship

Serbia men's national under-17 basketball team

 2014 Third place FIBA Under-17 Basketball World Cup

Serbia men's national under-16 basketball team

 1997, 1999, 2001, 2003, 2007 Champions FIBA U16 European Championship
 2013 Runners-up FIBA U16 European Championship
 2006, 2009, 2012, 2017 Third place FIBA U16 European Championship

Serbian men's university basketball team

 2001, 2003, 2009, 2011 Champions Basketball at the Summer Universiade
 1999, 2007 Runners-up Basketball at the Summer Universiade
 2005, 2013 Third place Basketball at the Summer Universiade

Serbia men's national 3x3 team

 2012,2016,2017,2018 Champions FIBA 3x3 World Cup
 2014 Runners-up FIBA 3x3 World Cup
 2018,2019 Champions FIBA 3x3 Europe Cup
 2016 Runners-up FIBA 3x3 Europe Cup
 2015 Third place Basketball at the 2015 European Games

Serbia men's national under-18 3x3 team

 2010 Champions Basketball at the Youth Olympic Games
 2012 Champions FIBA 3x3 Under-18 World Championships
 2018 Runners-up FIBA Europe Under-18 3x3 Championships

International (women)

Serbia women's national basketball team:

 2016 Third place Basketball at the Summer Olympics
 2015  Champions EuroBasket Women
 2019 Third place EuroBasket Women
 2021 Champions EuroBasket Women
 2009 Runners-up Mediterranean Games
Serbia women's national under-20 basketball team:

 2007, 2018 Runners-up FIBA U20 Women's European Championship
 2008 Third place FIBA U20 Women's European Championship

Serbia women's national under-18 and under-19 basketball team:

 2005, 2007 Champions FIBA U18 Women's European Championship
 2006 Runners-up FIBA U18 Women's European Championship
 2012, 2013 Third place FIBA U18 Women's European Championship
 2005 Runners-up FIBA Under-19 Women's Basketball World Cup
 2007 Third place FIBA Under-19 Women's Basketball World Cup

Serbia women's national under-16 and under-17 basketball team:

 2003 Champions FIBA Europe Under-16 Championship for Women
 1999, 2004 Runners-up FIBA Europe Under-16 Championship for Women

Club
Euroleague
1991–92 winners: Partizan
FIBA Saporta Cup 
 1973–74 winners Crvena zvezda 
FIBA Korać Cup
 1977–78, 1978–79, 1988–89 winners Partizan
ABA League
 2007, 2008, 2009, 2010, 2011, 2013 winners Partizan
 2014–15, 2015–16, 2016–17, 2018–19, 2020–21 winners Crvena zvezda 
 2003–04, 2005–06 winners KK FMP
 2005 winners KK Vršac
ABA League Supercup
 2018 winners Crvena zvezda 
 2019 winners Partizan
Junior ABA League
 2017–18 winners Mega Bemax U19
 2020–21 winners Mega Soccerbet U19
Euroleague Basketball Next Generation Tournament
 2007–08 winners FMP
 2008–09 winners FMP
 2013–14 winners Crvena zvezda Telekom
 2006–07,2009–10 Runners-up FMP
 2014–15, 2015–16 Runners-up Crvena zvezda Telekom
 2016–17, 2018–19 Runners-up Mega Bemax
Serbian Basketball clubs in European competitions:

 KK Partizan in EuroLeague
 KK Partizan in Europe
 KK Crvena zvezda in international competitions

EuroLeague Women
1978–79 winners: ŽKK Crvena zvezda

Volleyball

International (men)

Serbia men's national volleyball team:

 2000 Champions, 1996 Third place Volleyball at the Summer Olympics
 1998 Runners-up,   2010 Third place FIVB Volleyball Men's World Championship
 2003 Third place FIVB Volleyball Men's World Cup
 2001 Third place FIVB Volleyball World Grand Champions Cup
 2016 Champions, 2003 2005 2008 2009 2015 Runners-up, 2002 2004 2010 Third place FIVB Volleyball World League
 2001 2011 2019 Champions, 1997 Runners-up, 1995 1999 2005 2007 2013 2017 Third place Men's European Volleyball Championship
 2005 Third place Mediterranean Games

Serbia men's national under-21 volleyball team

 2011 Third place FIVB U21 World Championship

Serbia men's national under-19 volleyball team

 2009 2011 Champions FIVB U19 World Championship
 2011 Champions, 2009 Runners-up Boys' Youth European Volleyball Championship

International (women)

Serbia women's national volleyball team:

 2016 Runners-up Volleyball at the Summer Olympics
 2018 Champions, 2006 Third place FIVB Volleyball Women's World Championship
 2011 2017 2019 Champions, 2007 Runners-up, 2015 Third place Women's European Volleyball Championship
 2015 Runners-up FIVB Volleyball Women's World Cup
 2011, 2013,2017 Third place FIVB Volleyball World Grand Prix
 2015 Third place European Games 
 2009, 2010, 2011 Champions, 2012 Third place Women's European Volleyball Leagu

Serbia women's national under-20 volleyball team:

 2014 Champions, 2010 2012 2016 Runners-up Europe U19 Championship

Serbia women's national under-18 volleyball team:

 2009 Runners-up, 2011 Third place FIVB Volleyball Girls' U18 World Championship
 2007, 2009, 2015 Runners-up, 2011 Third place Girls' Youth European Volleyball Championship

Club

CEV Challenge Cup 

 2014–15 Champions Vojvodina NS Seme Novi Sad

Handball

International (men)

Serbia men's national handball team:

 1999, 2001 Third place World Men's Handball Championship
 2012 Runner-up, 1996 Third place European Men's Handball Championship
 2009 Champions Handball at the Mediterranean Games

International (women)

Serbia women's national handball team:

 2013 Runner-up, 2001 Third place IHF World Women's Handball Championship
 2013 Champions, 2005 Runner-up Handball at the Mediterranean Games

Club
EHF Champions League
1984–85 Champions League winners: Metaloplastika Šabac
1985–86 Champions League winners: Metaloplastika Šabac

EHF Women's Champions League
1975–76 Champions League winners: ŽRK Radnički Belgrade
1979–80 Champions League winners: ŽRK Radnički Belgrade
1983–84 Champions League winners: ŽRK Radnički Belgrade

EHF European Cup 

 2000–01 Champions RK Jugović Kać

Water polo

International

Serbia men's national water polo team:

 2016 Rio de Janeiro Champions Olympic Games
 2004 Athens Runner-up Olympic Games
 2000 Sydney 2008 Beijing 2012 London Third place Olympic Games
 2005 Montreal 2009 Rome 2015 Kazan Champions World Championship
 2001 Fukuoka 2011 Shanghai Runner-up World Championship
 1998 Perth 2003 Barcelona 2017 Budapest Third place World Championship
 2006 Budapest 2010 Oradea 2014 Almaty Champions FINA World Cup
 2002 Belgrade 2018 Berlin Third place FINA World Cup
 2005 Belgrade 2006 Athens 2007 Berlin 2008 Genoa 2010 Niš 2011 Florence 2013 Chelyabinsk 2014 Dubai 2015 Bergamo 2016 Huizhou 2017 Ruza 2019 Belgrade Champions FINA World League
 2004 Long Beach Runner-up FINA World League
 2009 Podgorica Third place FINA World League
 2001 Budapest 2003 Kranj 2006 Belgrade 2012 Eindhoven 2014 Budapest 2016 Belgrade 2018 Barcelona Champions European Championship
 1997 Seville 2008 Malaga Runner-up European Championship
 2010 Zagreb Third place European Championship
 1997 Bari 2009 Pescara 2018 Tarragona Champions Mediterranean Games
 2005 Almeria Third place Mediterranean Games
 2005 Izmir 2011 Shenzhen 2017 Taipei Champions Summer Universiade
 2003 Daegu Runner-up Summer Universiade
 2009 Belgrade 2013 Kazan Third place Summer Universiade

Serbian water polo teams in junior categories won medals in the following competitions:

 FINA Junior Water Polo World Championships
 FINA Youth Water Polo World Championships
 LEN European U19 Water Polo Championship
 LEN European Junior Water Polo Championship

Club
LEN Champions League
 1963–64 Champions League winners: Partizan
 1965–66 Champions League winners: Partizan
 1966–67 Champions League winners: Partizan
 1970–71 Champions League winners: Partizan
 1974–75 Champions League winners: Partizan
 1975–76 Champions League winners: Partizan
 1999–00 Champions League winners: Bečej
 2010–11 Champions League winners: Partizan
 2012–13 Champions League winners: Crvena zvezda

LEN Euro Cup 

 1997–98: Partizan
 2012–13: Radnički Kragujevac

LEN Cup Winners' Cup 

 1990-91 Partizan

LEN Super Cup 

 1991 Partizan
 2011 Partizan
 2013 Crvena zvezda

Tennis
Players Grand Slam Singles-Doubles-Mixed Doubles

 Novak Djokovic (22) -Australian Open 2008, 2011, 2012, 2013, 2015, 2016, 2019, 2020, 2021, 2023  - Wimbledon 2011, 2014, 2015, 2018, 2019, 2021, 2022  US Open  2011, 2015, 2018 - French Open 2016, 2021
 Nenad Zimonjić (8) - Australian Open 2004, 2008- Wimbledon 2008, 2009, 2014 -French Open 2006, 2010, 2010 
 Jelena Janković (1) - Wimbledon 2007
 Ana Ivanovic (1) - French Open 2008
 Monica Seles (8) - Australian Open 1991, 1992, 1993 - US Open 1991, 1992 - French Open 1990, 1991, 1992
 Slobodan Živojinović (1) - US Open 1986

International
Davis Cup
2010 Davis Cup winners
2013 Davis Cup runner-up
ATP Cup
2020 ATP Cup winners
World Team Cup
2009 World Team Cup winners
2012 World Team Cup winners
Fed Cup
2012 Fed Cup runner-up

Sporting infrastructure
List of football stadiums in Serbia
List of indoor arenas in Serbia

Serbia in big competitions 

 Serbia at the FIFA World Cup
 Serbia at the UEFA European Championship
 Serbia at the Olympics
 Serbia at the Paralympics
 Serbia at the European Games
 Serbia at the Universiade
 Serbia at the European Youth Olympic Festival
 Serbia at the Mediterranean Games
Serbian football clubs in European competitions

League system in Serbia 

 Serbian football league system
 Serbian basketball league system

Serbia sports award 

 Serbian Footballer of the Year and Coach of the Year
 Serbian Basketball Player of the Year
 Awards of Olympic Committee of Serbia
 DSL Sport

Serbian sports newspapers 

 Sportski žurnal
 DSL Sport
 Tempo

Anti-doping agency 
The Anti-Doping Agency of the Republic of Serbia (ADAS) deals with the control of doping in sports in Serbia. Tests athletes at domestic and international competitions in the country, as well as when there is no competition, performs analyzes, determines the penalty after a possible violation of the rules, gives recommendations and advice to combat doping, etc. In November 2005, the Serbian Parliament adopted law on the prevention of doping in sports, which established the agency.In addition to athletes, ADAS also tests horses in equestrian sports. The agency punishes athletes who use funds from the illicit list, as well as coaches who give them to athletes. Penalties are most often in the form of a ban on competition for a certain period of time, sometimes for life, and there are also fines.

Serbian supporter associations 
Serbian fan groups have a long history. They follow their clubs at home matches, but also abroad. Many groups are extreme. Serbian fan groups are connected in fraternal relations with fans from Russia and Greece.

Beli Orlovi
 Crveni Đavoli
 Delije
 Firma
 Grobari
 Marinci
 Meraklije
 Plava unija
United Force
Interrupted matches:

 Partizan - Zrinjski Mostar  UEFA expelled Partizan from the 2007–08 UEFA Cup due to crowd trouble at their away tie in Mostar, which forced the match to be interrupted for 10 minutes. UEFA adjudged travelling Partizan fans to have been the culprits of the trouble, but Partizan were allowed to play the return leg while the appeal was being processed. However, Partizan's appeal was rejected so Zrinjski Mostar qualified.
Dinamo–Red Star riot  It took the Zagreb police about 15 minutes to surround Zvezda's fans and calm them down, but it was not easy, because there was a big fight between the police and Zvezda's fans in which one police officer was seriously injured. Then, the Zagreb police managed to take Zvezda's fans, accompanied by them, to Maksimir Park, not far from the stadium, with the intention of keeping them there until the beginning of the game and escorting them to the stadium, but they did not succeed, because Zvezda the fans mostly pulled out of that hoop. In the very center of Zagreb, there were several fights, between Zvezda and Dinamo fans, in which two Dinamo fans were seriously injured.When the start of the match was approaching, the Zagreb police escorted Zvezda's fans (there were over 2,000 of them) to the south stand of the Maksimir Stadium. Even while the stands were filled with the audience, verbal skirmishes and standard name-calling of Zvezda and Dinamo fans started, followed by mutual insults, even on a national basis.As soon as a few minutes of the match were played, Dinamo fans of the "Bad Blue Boys" very easily broke down the protective fence on the north stand of the Maksimir Stadium.A physical confrontation between Dinamo and Zvezdaš followed, which lasted for almost an hour, and part of those riots were recorded by the cameras of TV Zagreb.Almost three hours after this unplayed match, Zvezda fans were detained at the demolished Maksimir Stadium. At that time, they were provided with buses that transported them to Dugo Selo, a suburb of Zagreb, and then they were taken by an emergency train to Belgrade, where they arrived in the morning hours of May 14, 1990.
 Serbia v Albania match was abandoned with the score at 0–0 shortly before halftime after "various incidents", which resulted in the Albania players refusing to return to the field. UEFA ruled that Albania had forfeited the match and awarded a 3–0 win to Serbia, but also deducted three points from Serbia for their involvement in the events. Serbia must also play their next two home qualifying games behind closed doors, and both the Serbian and Albanian FAs were fined €100,000. Both the Serbian and Albanian football associations were looking to have the decision revisited, but the decision was upheld by UEFA. Both associations then filed further appeals to the Court of Arbitration for Sport, and on 10 July 2015 the Court of Arbitration for Sport rejected the appeal filed by the Serbian FA, and upheld in part the appeal filed by the Albanian FA, meaning the match is deemed to have been forfeited by Serbia with 0–3 and they are still deducted three points. Serbian FA announced appeal at the Federal Supreme Court of Switzerland.
 Italy v Serbia match was abandoned after six minutes due to rioting by Serbian fans.The match was stopped after only six minutes due to riots caused by the visiting fans. The match was supposed to start at 20.50, but the start was postponed for more than half an hour because the visiting fans threw torches on the field, but also among the home spectators, and one fell very close to the home goalkeeper Viviani, so the referee decided to return the players to the locker rooms until the police bring order to the stadium.In the meantime, the police isolated Serbian fans in the stands and it seemed that the situation calmed down, so the match, after the appeal of the Serbian national team, started with a delay of 35 minutes. But after just a few minutes of play and new torches thrown into the pitch, Scottish referee Craig Thomson definitely stopped the match.On the eve of the match, a group of Serbian fans attacked goalkeeper Vladimir Stojković at the moment when the bus with Serbian players was heading towards the stadium. A more serious incident was prevented, but Stojković refused to defend, so Željko Brkić took his place in the first team.  The UEFA Control and Disciplinary Body awarded the match as a 3–0 forfeit win to Italy.
Serbia and Montenegro v Bosnia and Herzegovina played a deciding match on the last matchday of 2006 World Cup qualifying, The circumstances and high stakes made this an extremely important clash for Serbia. Not to mention the fact that both nations were parts of SFR Yugoslavia, which further raised the tensions. Going into the last matchday, Serbia-Montenegro was top of the group - two points ahead of second placed Spain and three points in spare compared to the third placed Bosnia-Herzegovina. Spain, however, was to play the minnows of the group San Marino and was virtually assured a win. With such highly probable scenario in the Spanish game, Serbia-Bosnia clash in Belgrade gained extra significance. The points advantage on top seemingly gave Serbia an advantage, but they still almost certainly needed a win because the math was mind-boggling. If the Belgrade score was to be tied, Serbia and Spain would then be equal on points at the top of the group and their two previous matches would have to decide who gets the first spot and automatic qualification. However, both of those games ended in ties (0-0 in Belgrade, 1–1 in Madrid), and according to FIFA rules, unlike UEFA's, away goals count for nothing, so goal difference would be the next deciding factor. That meant that if Bosnia managed to get a tie in Belgrade and Spain beat San Marino by a 4-goal margin, the Spaniards would be on top and Serbia would go into the playoffs. Bosnia was also not without a chance - if it managed to beat Serbia by any score in Belgrade, it would've become tied on points with Serbia, but would overtake it because the first match in Sarajevo ended in a 0–0 tie. Right from the start the tensions were extremely high, the stadium was packed . Mateja Kežman put the Serbs up in 7th minute, and the lead was not relinquished until the end. Serbia-Montenegro qualified directly for Germany 2006, sparking jubilant scenes all over Serbia & Montenegro. A physical confrontation followed, which was started by the fans of the home team, and torches, stones, parts of broken chairs flew to the tribune of BiH fans ...UEFA then stood calmly and watched the clashes in the stands, the captain of Bosnia and Herzegovina. of the national team, Sergei Barbarez pointed out to the judges the war being waged in the stands, but no one reacted. BiH fans suffered serious injuries, and a fan comment that cheered on the visiting national team while showing a wound on their forehead spoke more than any other word that night.
Serbia–Croatia semifinal (2012 European Men's Handball Championship) Events during the competition and later during the semifinal match: On 24 January 2012, after the match between Croatia and France, Serbian hooligans attacked Croatian fans in several locations in northern Serbia. In Novi Sad, Croatian supporters were heading home after the game, when they ran into a road block and some 50 masked men assaulted them with stones, bricks and axes, smashing windscreens. The attack left several supporters injured and one of them hospitalized. In Ruma, about 30 kilometres (19 mi) south from Novi Sad, a Croatian van was set on fire and one of the passengers stabbed with a knife.A day later the unrest continued and many cars were damaged, torched, or burnt out throughout Novi Sad. The Croatian Foreign Ministry officially complained to Serbian Ambassador Stanimir Vukicevic over the attacks; Vukicevic expressed regret and stated that the Serbian police was already taking the necessary steps. Thirteen people were arrested in connection with the incident, including Ivan Ključovski and Jovan Bajić, leaders of a fan group from Novi Sad, and a member of the Obraz right-wing organization. After questioning, all of them remained in custody for a month. Serbia and Croatia met in the semi-final of the tournament, which caused further concern on both sides. About 5,000 policemen were deployed to ensure the security of the fans, while in Croatia some tourist agencies cancelled trips for the match and the Croatian Handball Federation (Hrvatski rukometni savez, HRS) also recommended not to go to Serbia as the supporters' safety might not be guaranteed. Spokesman Zlatko Skrinjar also added that the HRS had planned to organize trips for the event, however, they changed their mind due to the incidents in the preceding days. On the Croatian-Serbian border, joint checkpoints were set up to prevent hooligans and other groups who have no ticket for the match to enter Serbia, and to escort the fans with tickets from the border to Belgrade.  The police reported that there were no incidents during the match, which was eventually won by the Serbians 26–22, however, a bottle actually meant for Croatian playmaker Ivano Balić and coach Slavko Goluža hit Serbian back player Žarko Šešum, severely injuring his eye. Šešum's eye suffered significant bleeding. After the trauma he had only minimal vision on the affected eye, but the risk of permanent sight loss was reportedly averted. Morten Stig Christensen, Secretary of the Danish Handball Federation, Serbia's opponent in the final said that he was "severely shocked" by the incident and so were the people from the European Handball Federation with whom he spoke. Christensen also added that he was shocked that although there were more than five thousand security personnel at the stadium, the hooligans still managed to sneak in Roman candles and laser lights.

Serbian fans hold the record for the largest visit to the EuroCup Basketball

Highest attendance records:

 24,232 attendance for Red Star Belgrade in a 79–70 win over Budivelnyk Kyiv, at Kombank Arena, Belgrade, on 26 March 2014.
 22,736 attendance for Red Star Belgrade in a 63–52 win over UNICS Kazan, at Kombank Arena, Belgrade, on 2 April 2014.

Serbian fans hold the record for the largest visit to the Euroleague

Season averages Euroleague:

Rivals of Serbian clubs and national teams 
Largest derbies:

 Derby of Serbia
 Eternal derby
 Crvena Zvezda–Partizan basketball rivalry
 Budućnost–Crvena Zvezda basketball rivalry

Belgrade derbies:

 OFK Belgrade vs. Red Star Belgrade
 OFK Belgrade vs. Partizan Belgrade
 Rad Belgrade vs. Red Star Belgrade
 OFK Belgrade vs. Rad Belgrade
 Rad Belgrade vs. Partizan Belgrade
 FK Voždovac vs. Rad Belgrade
 FK Zemun vs. OFK Belgrade, Partizan Belgrade or Red Star Belgrade

Others derbies:

 Novi Sad derby: Vojvodina Novi Sad vs. FK Novi Sad
 Derbi nizije (Lowland derby) or Derbi ravnice (Plain derby): Vojvodina Novi Sad vs. Spartak Subotica
 Political derby: FK Rad vs. FK Novi Pazar
 Šumadija derby: Radnički Kragujevac vs. FK Smederevo
 South Serbian derby: GFK Dubočica vs. Radnički Niš

National teams:

 Croatia–Serbia football rivalry
Albania–Serbia football rivalry

Sport events hosted in Serbia

Multi Sport Events
2007 European Youth Summer Olympic Festival
2009 Summer Universiade

Aquatic sports 
1973 World Aquatics Championships
 2008 European Junior Swimming Championships
 2011 European Junior Swimming Championships

Athletics
Belgrade Marathon, annually
1962 European Athletics Championships
1969 European Indoor Games
2009 European Athletics Junior Championships
2013 European Cross Country Championships
2017 European Athletics Indoor Championships

Basketball
EuroBasket Women 1954
EuroBasket 1961
EuroBasket 1975
2005 EuroBasket
2007 FIBA Under-19 World Championship
2011 FIBA Europe Under-20 Championship for Women
EuroBasket Women 2019 (alongside Latvia)
2018 EuroLeague Final Four

Boxing
1961 European Amateur Boxing Championships
1973 European Amateur Boxing Championships
1978 World Amateur Boxing Championships
1987 Boxing World Cup

Canoeing 
1971 ICF Canoe Sprint World Championships
1975 ICF Canoe Sprint World Championships
1978 ICF Canoe Sprint World Championships
1982 ICF Canoe Sprint World Championships
2011 Canoe Sprint European Championships
2018 Canoe Sprint European Championships

Chess
1990 29th Chess Olympiad
2009 European Team Chess Championship
2013 European Individual Chess Championship for Women

Cycling
Tour de Serbie
2021 European Mountain Bike Championships

Fencing
2018 European Fencing Championships

Football
UEFA Euro 1976
1973 European Cup Final
1979 UEFA Cup Final
2011 UEFA European Under-17 Football Championship

Futsal
2016 UEFA Futsal Championship

Gymnastics
1963 European Men's Artistic Gymnastics Championships

Handball
1957 World Women's Handball Championship
1973 World Women's Handball Championship
2012 European Men's Handball Championship
2012 European Women's Handball Championship
2013 World Women's Handball Championship

Judo
1989 World Judo Championships
2006 European Judo Open Championships
2007 European Judo Championships

Karate
1998 European Karate Championships
2010 World Karate Championships
2018 European Karate Championships

Rowing
1932 European Rowing Championships
2014 European Rowing Championships

Shooting
1957 European Shooting Championships
1972 10m European Shooting Championships
2005 European Shooting Championships
2010 ISSF World Cup 
2008 ISSF World Cup 
2011 World Shotgun Championships
2011 European Shooting Championships

Table tennis
1974 Table Tennis European Championships
1981 World Table Tennis Championships
2007 Table Tennis European Championships
2009 Table Tennis European Championships
2010 Table Tennis European Championships
2003 European Youth Table Tennis Championships
1988 European Youth Table Tennis Championships

Tennis
Serbia Open, 2009–2012
2010 Davis Cup, World Group final
2013 Davis Cup, World Group final

Volleyball
1975 Men's European Volleyball Championship
1975 Women's European Volleyball Championship
2005 Men's European Volleyball Championship
2005 FIVB Volleyball World League, Final Round
2005 Men's European Volleyball Championship
2009 FIVB Volleyball World League, Final Round
2011 Women's European Volleyball Championship
2013 Boys' Youth European Volleyball Championship
2013 Girls' Youth European Volleyball Championship
2021 Women's European Volleyball Championship

Water polo
2002 FINA Water Polo World Cup
2005 FINA Men's Water Polo World League, Super Final
2006 Men's European Water Polo Championship
2006 Women's European Water Polo Championship
2010 FINA Men's Water Polo World League, Super Final
2016 Men's European Water Polo Championship
2016 Women's European Water Polo Championship
2019 FINA Men's Water Polo World League
2008 LEN European Junior Water Polo Championship Men's tournament
2017 LEN European Junior Water Polo Championship Women's tournament 
2018 FINA Youth Water Polo World Championships Women's tournament

Weightlifting
1980 European Weightlifting Championships

Wrestling
2003 European Greco-Roman Wrestling Championships 
2012 European Wrestling Championships
2017 European Wrestling Championships

References